Nargus is a genus of beetles belonging to the family Leiodidae.

Species:
 Nargus anisotomoides
 Nargus badius

References

Leiodidae